Rolleiflex is the name of a long-running and diverse line of high-end cameras originally made by the German company Franke & Heidecke, and later Rollei-Werke.

History 
The "Rolleiflex" name is most commonly used to refer to Rollei's premier line of medium format twin lens reflex (TLR) cameras. (A companion line intended for amateur photographers, Rolleicord, existed for several decades.) However, a variety of TLRs and SLRs in medium format, and zone focus, and SLR 35 mm, as well as digital formats have also been produced under the Rolleiflex label. The 120 roll film Rolleiflex series is marketed primarily to professional photographers.  Rolleiflex cameras have used film formats 117 (Original Rolleiflex), 120 (Standard, Automat, Letter Models, Rollei-Magic, and T model), and 127 (Baby Rolleiflex).

The Rolleiflex TLR film cameras were known for their exceptional build quality, compact size, modest weight, superior optics, durability, simplicity, reliable mechanics and bright viewfinders. The high-quality 7.5 cm focal length lenses, manufactured by Zeiss and Schneider, allowed for a smaller, lighter, more compact camera than their imitators. The highly regarded Zeiss Planar f2.8 and Schneider Xenotar lenses, both 80mm focal length and fast in comparison, are both state of the art optics. Unique to the Rolleiflex Automat and letter model cameras, the mechanical wind mechanism was robust and clever, making film loading semi-automatic and quick. This mechanism started the exposure counter automatically, auto-spaced the 12 or (on the later model F cameras) 24 exposures, and tensioned the shutter; all with less than one full turn of the film advance crank. This makes the Rolleiflex Automat/Letter model cameras very sought-after for shooting fast-paced action, such as street photography.

A range of accessories made this camera a system: panorama head, sun shade, parallax-corrected close-ups lenses, color correction, contrast enhancing, and special effect filters, all mounted with a quick release bayonet, as well as a quick-change tripod attachment. Some, professional, amateur and fine-art photographers still shoot Rolleiflex TLR film cameras with color transparency, color negative, or black-and-white film. The later f2.8 and f3.5 letter models (Planar or Xenotar lens) are highly sought after in the used market, and command the greatest price. Historically there were five focal length cameras available including 5.5 cm Rollei-Wide, 6.0 cm Baby Rollei,  7.5 cm (f:3.5), 8.0 cm (f2.8), and 13.5 cm (f:4 Zeiss Sonnar) Tele-Rolleiflex. Although all Rolleflex cameras can be fine user cameras, there is also an active market for many Rolleiflex models as collectables, and this adds (greatly in some models) to the end price paid, particularly in Japan.

Rolleiflex medium format cameras continued to be produced by DHW Fototechnik up to 2014—a company founded by former Franke & Heidecke employees. DHW Fototechnik announced two new Rolleiflex cameras and a new electronic shutter for photokina 2012. The company filed for insolvency in 2014 and was dissolved in April 2015, ending any further production. The factory production equipment and remaining stocks of parts were auctioned off in late April 2015.

A smaller company was created again with former DHW Fototechnik employees, under the name DW Photo at the same location. DW Photo focuses on producing the Rolleiflex Hy6 mod2 medium format SLR camera (digital & film), servicing existing cameras, including providing firmware and hardware upgrades.

Notable models

Original Rolleiflex

This first Rolleiflex was introduced in 1929 after three years of development, and was the company's first medium format roll-film camera, which was used with unpopular 117 (B1) film. It was a Twin-Lens Reflex camera.

Old Standard
 The "Old Standard" was originally known as simply the "Standard" until the introduction of the New Standard in 1939.
 This model introduced a hinged back and a frame counter. While not automatic, like in the Rolleiflex Automat, the photographer could reset the counter with a small button after reaching the first frame
 Robert Capa used an Old Standard to document World War II.

Rolleiflex Automat
 Introduced an automatic film counter; this counter senses the thickness of the film backing to accurately begin counting frames, obviating the need for the ruby window that forced the photographer to read the frame number off the backing paper of the film.
 This model won the Grand Prix award at the Paris World's Fair in 1937.
 The first Rolleiflex to offer a Schneider Kreuznach Xenar taking lens as an option, in addition to the Carl Zeiss Tessar.

Rolleiflex 2.8A
Incorporated the first 8 cm f2.8 taking lens (either an 80 mm Carl Zeiss Tessar or Opton Tessar) into the Rolleiflex line. It also added an X flash synch contact. Built from 1949 to 1951.

Rolleiflex 2.8E 
Released in October 1956, this was the first model with a built in, uncoupled light meter as an option.

Tele Rolleiflex
This camera used a 135 mm/f4.0 Carl Zeiss Sonnar taking lens. The introduction to a 1990 sale catalogue by Sotheby's auction house in London estimated that approximately 1200 cameras existed at that date.

The new Tele Rolleiflex uses 135mm/f4 Schneider Tele-Xenar taking lens

Rolleiflex T
Released in 1959, this camera came in a new color of gray. The camera was most successful for it was more affordable to the public. The camera had a 75mm Tessar lens made of lanthanum glass, giving higher resolution and color correction.

Wide Rolleiflex
This camera had a 55 mm/f4.0 Carl Zeiss Distagon taking lens. The introduction to a 1990 sale catalogue by Sotheby's auction house in London estimated that fewer than 700 such cameras existed at that date. Only 3600 models were originally produced.

The new Wide Rolleiflex uses a 50mm/f4 Schneider Super-Angulon taking lens.

Rolleiflex SL66

Rollei's first medium-format SLR, introduced in 1966.

Rolleiflex SL35

A 35 mm SLR introduced in 1970.

Rolleiflex miniature Reproductions

There are two models of miniature Rolleiflex cameras. These are not true Rolleiflex cameras but are miniature reproductions of the Rolleiflex TLR design produced under licence by the German camera manufacturer Minox. The cameras are manufactured by the Japanese company Sharan Megahouse. One model is a miniature digital camera, the other is a miniature Rolleiflex TLR film camera.

The original model, now discontinued, was the Rolleiflex MiniDigi, a miniature reproduction of the TLR Rolleiflex. In many details the camera retained the look of the original, including a waist-level viewfinder and a crank to prepare the camera for the next shot. As the name implies, the camera was a digital reproduction, with the "viewing" lens being a dummy. The camera had a 2 megapixel CMOS sensor in the square format of the traditional TLR. The lens was a 9 mm f/2.8 with 5 elements, focusing down to 10 cm. The shutter speeds were automatically controlled between 1/15 to 1/400 second, exposure time was automatic. The camera was operated by a single CR2 battery. The storage media were either SD or MMC cards.

This was superseded by the MINOX DCC (Digital Classic Camera) Rolleiflex AF 5.0. The name change brings the current model more firmly in line with the rest of Minox's Classic Camera miniature reproduction range. It is visually identical to the original model, but available in both black and red leather finishes. The CMOS sensor has been upgraded to 3 megapixels, with 5.0 megapixels available by interpolation. The taking lens is a 4.9 mm f/2.8; the camera has digital autofocus. The electronic shutter has also been upgraded to a maximum speed of 1/2500 of a second. The camera operates on a single CR2 battery and uses miniSD memory cards.

There was also a 1/3 scale miniature Rolleiflex TLR, using Minox film, producing 36 exposures of 8x11mm format negative.

List of models

References

External links

 Articles on Rolleiflex Photography by Dan Wagner
 Rolleiflex UK - authorized dealer Online store selling Rollei and Rolleiflex products to the UK and EU. Information and documentation about DHW products. 
 Authorized US Dealer and Distributor for DHW-Fototechnik
 Rolleiflex Repair Shops and Related Services worldwide by Ferdi Stutterheim
 Paepke Fototechnik (Repair and maintenance of Rolleiflex cameras and other Rollei equipment) English and German
 Rollei TLR camera website by Peter Wolff
 Rolleiflex 6×6 cm Twin Lens Reflex website by Ferdi Stutterheim
 Rolleiflex 4×4 cm (Baby-Rolleiflex) website by Ferdi Stutterheim
 Rolleiflex SL 66 website by Ferdi Stutterheim
 Rolleiflex 6000 System website by Ferdi Stutterheim
 Rollei History (History timeline of Rollei GmbH)
 Club Rollei User (Club for all Users, Collectors and Enthusiasts of Rollei photography)

German cameras
Rollei TLR cameras
Rollei brands
120 film cameras
Articles containing video clips